Single-use medical devices include any medical equipment, instrument or apparatus having the ability to only be used once in a hospital or clinic and then disposed. The Food and Drug Administration defines this as any device entitled by its manufacturer that it is intended use is for one single patient and one procedure only. It is not reusable, therefore has a short lifespan, and is limited to one patient.

There are countless types of single use medical devices, ranging from external, such as plastic gumboots, gloves and bandages merely used to assist a patient to more complex and internal devices, consisting of sharp blades, needles and tubes. Both these devices are single used, because of multiple reasons, but mainly, as it came in contact with radioactivity, blood, infection and disease or human tissue and must therefore be terminated. Each country has its own strict legislation regarding medical waste and the reprocessing of medical devices in hospitals and clinics.

Reasons for single-use only 

There are multiple reasons for a single-use device to be disposed of after using, which include:

Design features 
The device may be manufactured a certain way, making it impossible to properly sterilise, decontaminate and disinfect, which then could possibly be harmful if reused and cause cross-contamination.

Endotoxin reaction and chemical burns or sensitisation 
There could be small amounts of excessive bacteria left over, even after sterilising, which could spark reactions and be hazardous. The device could easily absorb chemical residue from disinfectant agents

Patient safety 
The likelihood of the device might not be able to reach its supposed level of functionality after being reused or remanufactured. The devices’ medium could be alliterated to become weak and impractical.

Different devices 

Single-use devices stretch over a large area of the medical industry. Different devices are used in every region of the world and also every area of the hospital.

First world countries would have access to a larger range of devices than third world countries struggling to even get in contact with medicinal products. Examples include: “Hypodermic needles, syringes, applicators, bandages and wraps, drug tests, exam gowns, face masks, gloves, suction catheters, and surgical sponges.”

Some examples of single use devices that can be reprocessed are ventilator circuits, biopsy forceps, blades and drill bits, vaginal speculums, breast pump kits, clamps and ET tubes.

Legislation 
Each country has their own strict legislation on single use medical devices. They all feature similar overall ideas, that focus on putting a patient’s health and safety first, with clear emphasis on sterilisation. In Australia the following legislation applies on medical devices, that includes single use medical devices.

“Medical devices are defined as follows by the Therapeutic Goods Act 1989 : a. any instrument, apparatus, appliance, material or other article (whether used alone or in combination, and including the software necessary for its proper application) intended, by the person under whose name it is or is to be supplied, to be used for human beings for the purpose of one or more of the following:

i.              diagnosis, prevention, monitoring, treatment or alleviation of disease;

ii.             diagnosis, monitoring, treatment, alleviation of, or compensation for, an injury or handicap;

iii.            investigation, replacement or modification of the anatomy or of a physiological process;

iv.           control of conception;

and that does not achieve its principal intended action in or on the human body by pharmacological, immunological or metabolic means, but that may be assisted in its function by such means; or

b. an accessory to such an instrument, apparatus, appliance, material or other article.

The Therapeutic Goods (Medical Devices) 2007 Regulations require a healthcare facility that reprocesses single-use devices to be licensed as a manufacturer. A healthcare facility that reprocesses single use devices would be considered to be a manufacturer under the Act and thus would be required to conform to the regulation and be subject to audit to ensure compliance.”

Environmental concern

Production 
The production element of single use devices is very simple. There are multiple large manufacturing companies, such as Elcam Medical in Israel that produce these medical devices, shipping them world wide to different hospitals, clinics and academic centres. The different processes, such as planning, building, producing, packaging and shipping all happen in this step of the process and is done by the manufacturers or ‘third-party’ companies and only received by the consumers after all aspects of the product is in perfect condition. The consumers (hospitals, clinics etc.) do not take a part in the production process, nor in the disposal or reproduction process. This is all done by ‘third-party’ organisations.

Medical waste 
Plastics have been the main material used in single use devices since the 1960s, where raw materials, such as glass, rubber, metal and woven textiles were in practice before. The modern production of poly-vinyls, polycarbonates and polystyrenes have substituted these previously used materials and have dominated the disposable healthcare market ever since. The main reason for this forward driven use of plastics, was because of economic reasons, as it was cheaper and more efficiently manufactured. This drastic change in materials used in the healthcare industry positively under held the increasing need for medical procedures with a growing globally population, resulting in fundamental changes in the legislation and producing that governed medical device manufacturing, use and disposal or waste.

The single use medical devices phenomenon has only recently occurred, as these previous medical products would undergo sterilisation and disinfecting onsite and be reused, but following the substitution of petroleum-based plastics, these devices would be received, used and then disposed of, which increases the quantities of medical waste enormously over the past decades globally. The production of SUDs has set trends universally in the medical industry, making it impossible to rely on any other source of device.

“In a study analysing the environmental impact of seven single-use medical devices undergoing reprocessing, all had some form of polyethylene in their contents. Total polyethylene weight ranged anywhere from 7% to 88% of total weight for individual devices and made up 52% of total weight for the combined average of the seven devices.”

Reprocessing SUD (Single-use devices)

History  
The reuse and reprocessing of SUDs have been implemented by hospitals around four decades ago, since the late 1970s for two specific benefits; environmental and economic. Glass and metal were mainly used before this time period and heavily sanitised before reusing on another procedure, but the increasing use of the latest plastic materials and market demand for SUDs, reprocessing was fast approaching. Most SUDs, such as needles, syringes and bandages that are in direct contact with human flesh or blood are indeed truly for single use only, but more complex SUDs, such as pacemakers commonly used in surgical procedures are often reprocessed as an economic benefit for the hospitals.

Most devices that have been categorised as single-use by their manufacturers, have now been reprocessed by third parties, to reuse. All original manufacturers of these devices try and spread the word to prevent potential dangers of infection, failure and danger. Hospitals reprocess SUDs themselves. “In 2000 a thriving third-party reprocessing industry has emerged in North America and Europe. Only about 2%–3% of all devices can be safely reprocessed.” The global income of third party SUD reprocessing companies are estimated to be “$1.054 billion.”

The reprocessing company, Innovative Health’s vice president of marketing and public affairs, Lars Thording states, “Some devices cannot be used more than once due to material degradation, technical limitations and patient safety. This is why we have the ‘single-use’ designation, and it is validly used to ensure patient safety and patient care efficacy.” Many companies add the single use label, to increase sales. “However, a small amount of single-use devices can be re-used, after going through stringent and controlled procedures. It is very possible that original manufacturers in some cases apply the single-use label to increase sales and ensure obsolescence.”

Risks 
The risks of reusing and reprocessing SUDs are the main reason for negative connotations to this industry, as the medical field specialises in risks and patient safety. The FDA released a guidance module regarding these aspects for manufactures, hospitals and any third-party company reprocessing SUDs. The module includes all potential risks involved, as risk assessment is needed before these products are manufactured or reused, to prevent the distribution of disease and infection, taking both the original produced device and the present features at time of sterilisation that could interfere in consideration. The risks vary with different reprocessed SUDs. Some devices are originally low risk, but after reprocessing may have increased risk to patient, where other low risk devices, remain low risk, provided that the sterilisation was conducted in an appropriate manner. There are also some SUDs that should be banned to be reused in all circumstances, as it will result in a high risk of contaminant at time present.

In many developing countries the reuse and reprocessing of SUDs are simply because of cost restraints and immediate need of these medical devices, but are potentially risk-bounded, as the sterilisation and standards are not yet up to date and could possibly be a hazard for patients. A study done in African countries, reports that 15% to 60% of clinics reuse immunisation needles and syringes without proper disinfecting, resulting in increasingly large cases of unsterilised injections. 55% of North-western China’s health care workers reported having used SUDs, resulting in an estimated 135 to 3120 per 100,000 population children in China to have obtained hepatitis B infections through unsafe vaccination practices.

Ethics and legalities 

A national survey was performed by Canadian Agency for Drugs and Technologies in Health (CADTH) of acute care facilities in Canada in 2008, establishing that 28% of responding hospitals reprocess SUDs, but the larger amount of 42%, was done more through bigger hospitals and academic centres. They found that of the hospitals recorded, in-house reprocessing was done by 85%, resulting in 40% not having written policy approving their practice. Since the development of policies, legal issues, risks awareness and standards having to be met, many hospitals have relied heavily on third party reprocessing companies, who specialise in reprocessing, making it more convenient and assessable for them. This process includes the shipping of infected SUDs, the reprocessors sterilising and disinfecting them and then being shipped back. In many cases the hospitals would receive unknown SUDs and not their own ones.

The most common ethical issue known in the reprocessing of SUDs is patient consent. A hospital carries the responsibility the moment they adopt a reuse policy. Seeking consent by informing a patient that a reused device is being used, which could trigger unnecessary uncertainty and not requiring consent, as a hospital should only have policies that would ensure 100% patient safety if any reused devices were to be used in surgery is an ongoing discussion in the industry. Commonly, hospitals not seeking consent could be accused of ‘hidden rationing’, not concerning a patient’s independence and putting one to risk if something were to occur and cause damage, as the likelihood of a device malfunctioning is increased with every reuse.

The economical ethics of not using a product more than once, if it is certainly capable to do so, could be viewed as unethical, as most of the time, manufacturers label these devices as single use and could arguably do so to increase sales and revenue, by hospitals constantly bulk buying, instead of focusing on patient safety as a priority.

The primary goal for the ethical reprocessing of SUDs is to protect the communal health, resulting in the patient’s health being put first and to ensure the reprocessing of the devices is done ethically, cost efficiently and safely with an outcome of the reused SUD to be considered as an effective brand new product with least amount of risk.

Manufacturing companies 
There are many manufacturing companies that produce and reprocess single use medical devices safe and efficiently.

Elcam Medical 
A world class producer of disposable medical devices and components for the OEM market, and a provider of innovative solutions for specialised flow control needs.

Cadence Inc. 
A single use medical device manufacturer catering for the OEM market. Their headquarters are in Staunton, Virginia.

Reprocessing companies

Innovative Health 
A reprocessing company, which specialises in the safe remanufacturing of SUDs.

Ascent Healthcare Solutions 
A multi-million-dollar company formed by two corporations merging in 2005; Vanguard Medical Concepts and Alliance Medical Corporation. Ascent has facilities in two locations where the reprocessing of medical devices is done, Phoenix, Arizona and Lakeland in Florida. It is transported and delivered across various states in North America, providing its services to 1800 hospitals and purchasing organisations. They specialise and offer devices in the cardiovascular, orthopaedics, gastroenterology, and general surgery industries complying to the FDA's 510(k) and Quality System Regulation requirements. Their staff base includes more than 900 employees.

ReNu Medical 
The 100% green FDA-registered medical reprocessing company was founded in 2000 in Everett, Washington. They focus on supplying chain saving and waste elimination, providing instant solutions to rising healthcare prices. They specialise in DVT Garments, Pulse Oximeter Probes and many other SUDs to hospitals and clinics nationwide.

References 

Medical devices